The year 1968 in film involved some significant events, with the release of Stanley Kubrick's 2001: A Space Odyssey, as well as two highly successful musical films, Funny Girl and Oliver!, the former earning Barbra Streisand the Academy Award for Best Actress (an honour she shared with Katharine Hepburn for her role in The Lion in Winter) and the latter winning both the Best Picture and Best Director awards.

Top-grossing films (U.S.)

The top ten 1968 released films by box office gross in North America are as follows:

Events
 November 1 – The MPAA's film rating system is introduced.

Awards 

Palme d'Or (Cannes Film Festival): canceled due to events of May 1968

Golden Lion (Venice Film Festival):
Die Artisten in der Zirkuskuppel: Ratlos (Artists under the Big Top: Perplexed), directed by Alexander Kluge, West Germany

Golden Bear (Berlin Film Festival):
Ole dole doff (Who Saw Him Die?), directed by Jan Troell, Sweden

Films released
US unless stated

January–March
January 1968 
January 3
The Wicked Dreams of Paula Schultz
January 8
Wild 90
January 12
Nobody's Perfect
January 17
The Biggest Bundle of Them All
January 18
Spider Baby
January 24 
Danger: Diabolik (Italy/U.S.)
Firecreek
Maryjane
Sebastian
January 25
Up the Junction
January 29 
How to Save a Marriage and Ruin Your Life
February 1968
February 7
The Anniversary
Sol Madrid
February 8
Blackbeard's Ghost
Sweet November
February 11
Charlie Bubbles
February 18
The Money Jungle
February 21
Bye Bye Braverman
The Power
February 24
Kuroneko (Japan)
February 29
The Secret War of Harry Frigg
March 1968
March 1
Day of the Evil Gun
March 5
Romeo and Juliet
March 6
P.J.
Psych-Out
March 8
A Man Called Gannon
Stay Away, Joe
March 11
Otley
March 13
Counterpoint
March 18
The Producers
March 20
No Way to Treat a Lady
Gamera vs. Viras (Japan)
March 21
The One and Only, Genuine, Original Family Band
March 27
Arizona Bushwhackers
March 29
Madigan

April–June
April 1968
April 2
A Dandy in Aspic
The Scalphunters
April 3
2001: A Space Odyssey
Planet of the Apes
April 4
The Party
April 10
The Charge of the Light Brigade
Hammerhead
Where Angels Go, Trouble Follows
Will Penny
April 14
The Bofors Gun
April 17
The Bride Wore Black (France)
The Private Navy of Sgt. O'Farrell
April 20
Baby Love
April 23
Blue
April 24
Yours, Mine and Ours
April 26
Je t'aime, je t'aime (France)
May 1968
May 1
Countdown
Don't Just Stand There!
The Mini-Skirt Mob
Tarzan and the Jungle Boy
May 2
The Odd Couple
May 10
Project X
May 15
The Devil's Brigade
The Swimmer
Witchfinder General (aka The Conqueror Worm)
May 17
Journey to Shiloh
May 23
Kona Coast
Prudence and the Pill
May 24
The Savage Seven
What's So Bad About Feeling Good?
May 28
Boom!
The Detective
May 29
Madigan's Millions
Villa Rides
Wild in the Streets
June 1968
June 1
Bandolero!
June 5
Angels from Hell
Chubasco
For Singles Only
Jigsaw
June 8
Kill! (Japan)
June 10
Petulia
June 12
Rosemary's Baby
Speedway
The Sweet Ride
June 19
The Green Berets
The Thomas Crown Affair
The Lost Continent
Where Were You When the Lights Went Out?
June 21
Salt and Pepper
June 25
The Secret Life of an American Wife
June 26
Never a Dull Moment

July–September
July 1968
 July 3
Dark of the Sun
Eve
July 12
Don't Raise the Bridge, Lower the River
A Lovely Way to Die
July 14
Did You Hear the One About the Traveling Saleslady?
July 15
Interlude
July 17
For Love of Ivy
July 19
Inspector Clouseau
July 20
The Devil Rides Out
July 23
Isabel
July 24
Anzio
The Strange Affair
July 29
In Enemy Country
July 31
5 Card Stud
Asterix the Gaul
The Heart Is a Lonely Hunter
August 1968
August 1
Destroy All Monsters (Japan)
August 3
Hang 'Em High
August 7
Farewell, Friend (France)
With Six You Get Eggroll
August 15
Targets
A Time to Sing
August 18
Stolen Kisses (France)
August 20
How Sweet It Is!
August 22
Nobody Runs Forever
August 24
A Stranger in Town
August 26
Rachel, Rachel
August 28
The Hell with Heroes
September 1968
September 2
Negatives
September 11
The Young Runaways
September 12
Spirits of the Dead (France/Italy)
September 15
Song of Summer (U.K.)
September 18
Funny Girl
Pretty Poison
September 19
Hot Millions
September 22
The Split
September 23
Charly
September 26
Oliver! (U.K.)

October–December
October 1968
October 1
Night of the Living Dead
October 2
Coogan's Bluff
October 7
I Love You, Alice B. Toklas
October 8
Deadfall
October 9
Finian's Rainbow
If He Hollers, Let Him Go!
October 10
Barbarella (U.S.)
October 13
The Subject Was Roses
October 14
Paper Lion
October 16
The Boston Strangler
The Girl on a Motorcycle
October 17
Bullitt
October 19
A Flea in Her Ear
October 22
Star!
Vixen!
Voyage to the Planet of Prehistoric Women
October 23
Live a Little, Love a Little
Secret Ceremony
October 24
Ice Station Zebra
October 30
The Lion in Winter
October 31
Ace High (Italy)
They Came to Rob Las Vegas
November 1968
November 6
Dracula Has Risen from the Grave
Head
November 13
Killers Three
Yellow Submarine
November 15
The Shoes of the Fisherman
November 16
The Legend of Lylah Clare
November 18
House of Cards
November 20
Lady in Cement
Woman in Chains (France)
November 24
Faces
Joanna
November 27
The Great Silence (Italy)
Hellfighters
November 28
Carry On Up the Khyber
November 30
The Shakiest Gun in the West
Sympathy for the Devil
December 1968
December 1
The Green Slime
December 4
Corruption
Where Eagles Dare
December 8
The Fixer
December 9
The Birthday Party
December 10
Buona Sera, Mrs. Campbell
The Magus
December 12
The Killing of Sister George
December 13
Shalako
December 15
Curse of the Crimson Altar
Greetings
December 16
Chitty Chitty Bang Bang (U.K.)
December 17
Candy
December 18
Hell in the Pacific
Isadora
The Night They Raided Minsky's
Uptight
December 19
if....
Mayerling (U.K./France)
A Place for Lovers
Skidoo
December 20
The Horse in the Gray Flannel Suit
Three in the Attic
Twisted Nerve
December 21
Once Upon a Time in the West (Italy)
December 22
The Sea Gull
December 24
The Love Bug
December 25
Assignment to Kill
The Brotherhood
The Sergeant
The Stalking Moon
December 26
Monterey Pop
Krakatoa, East of Java (Sweden)

Notable films released in 1968 
Note: U.S. releases unless stated.

#
5 Card Stud, starring Dean Martin, Robert Mitchum, Inger Stevens
17th Parallel: Vietnam in War (17e Parallele Le Vietnam en Guerre), a documentary directed by Joris Ivens – (France/Vietnam)
2001: A Space Odyssey, directed by Stanley Kubrick, starring Keir Dullea and Gary Lockwood – (U.S./ U.K.)

A
Aadmi, starring Dilip Kumar – (India)
Aankhen (The Eyes) – (India)
Ace High, starring Eli Wallach – (Italy)
Adieu l'ami (Farewell Friend), starring Alain Delon and Charles Bronson – (France)
All My Compatriots (Všichni dobří rodáci) – (Czechoslovakia)
The Amorous Ones (As Amorosas) – (Brazil)
The Anniversary, starring Bette Davis – (U.K.)
Anzio, starring Robert Mitchum, Earl Holliman, Peter Falk
Artists Under the Big Top (Die Artisten in der Zirkuskuppel: Ratlos), Golden Lion winner – (West Germany)
Assignment to Kill, starring Patrick O'Neal and Joan Hackett
Asterix and Cleopatra – (France/Belgium)

B
Baby Love, starring Linda Hayden and Keith Barron– (U.K.)
Bandits in Milan (Banditi a Milano), starring Gian Maria Volonté – (Italy)
Bandolero!, starring James Stewart, Dean Martin, Raquel Welch, George Kennedy, Will Geer
Barbarella, directed by Roger Vadim, starring Jane Fonda – (France/Italy)
Be Sick... It's Free (Il medico della mutua), starring Alberto Sordi – (Italy)
Berserk!, starring Joan Crawford and Diana Dors – (U.K.)
Les Biches, directed by Claude Chabrol, starring Stéphane Audran and Jean-Louis Trintignant – (France)
The Biggest Bundle of Them All, starring Raquel Welch and Edward G. Robinson
The Birthday Party, directed by William Friedkin, starring Robert Shaw – (U.K.)
Black Jesus (Seduto alla sua destra), starring Woody Strode – (Italy)
Blackbeard's Ghost, starring Dean Jones, Peter Ustinov, Suzanne Pleshette
Blue, starring Terence Stamp, Joanna Pettet, Karl Malden, and Ricardo Montalbán
The Bofors Gun, starring Nicol Williamson and Ian Holm – (U.K.)
Boom!, starring Elizabeth Taylor and Richard Burton – (U.K.)
The Boston Strangler, starring Tony Curtis and Henry Fonda
The Bride Wore Black (La Mariée était en noir), directed by François Truffaut, starring Jeanne Moreau and Michel Bouquet – (France)
Brilliantovaya ruka (The Diamond Arm) – a hugely popular Russian comedy – (U.S.S.R.)
The Brotherhood, starring Kirk Douglas
Bullitt, directed by Peter Yates, starring Steve McQueen, Jacqueline Bisset, Robert Vaughn
Buona Sera, Mrs. Campbell, starring Gina Lollobrigida, Shelley Winters, Phil Silvers, Peter Lawford, Telly Savalas
Bye Bye Braverman, directed by Sidney Lumet, starring George Segal, Jessica Walter, Joseph Wiseman

C
Candy, starring Marlon Brando, Richard Burton, James Coburn, Ringo Starr – (France/Italy/U.S.)
Capricious Summer (Rozmarné léto), directed by Jiří Menzel – (Czechoslovakia)
Carry On... Up the Khyber, starring Sid James and Kenneth Williams – (U.K.)
The Charge of the Light Brigade, directed by Tony Richardson, starring Trevor Howard, John Gielgud and Vanessa Redgrave – (U.K.)
Charly, starring Cliff Robertson
Chitty Chitty Bang Bang, starring Dick Van Dyke – (U.K.)
The Chronicle of Anna Magdalena Bach – (West Germany)
Colonel Wolodyjowski, directed by Jerzy Hoffman – (Poland)
Coogan's Bluff, directed by Don Siegel, starring Clint Eastwood, Susan Clark, Lee J. Cobb, Don Stroud
Corruption, directed by Robert Hartford-Davis – (U.K.)
Countdown, directed by Robert Altman and starring James Caan and Robert Duvall
Counterpoint, starring Charlton Heston, Maximilian Schell, Leslie Nielsen
Curse of the Crimson Altar (a.k.a. The Crimson Cult), starring Christopher Lee and Boris Karloff – (U.K.)

D
A Dandy in Aspic, starring Laurence Harvey, Tom Courtenay, and Mia Farrow – (U.K.)
Danger: Diabolik, starring John Phillip Law and Michel Piccoli – (Italy/U.S.)
Dark of the Sun (a.k.a. The Mercenaries), starring Rod Taylor and Yvette Mimieux – (U.K./U.S.)
Day of the Evil Gun, starring Glenn Ford
The Day of the Owl (Il giorno della civetta), starring Claudia Cardinale and Franco Nero – (Italy)
Dead Season (Myortvyy sezon) – (U.S.S.R.)
Deadfall, starring Michael Caine – (U.K.)
Death by Hanging (Kōshikei), directed by Nagisa Oshima – (Japan)
Death Laid an Egg (La morte ha fatto l'uovo), directed by Giulio Questi – (Italy/France)
Destroy All Monsters (Kaijū Sōshingeki), directed by Ishirō Honda – (Japan)
The Detective, starring Frank Sinatra, Lee Remick, Jacqueline Bisset, Jack Klugman, William Windom, Robert Duvall
The Devil Rides Out, starring Christopher Lee and Charles Gray – (U.K.)
The Devil's Brigade, starring William Holden, Cliff Robertson, Vince Edwards
Diamonds for Breakfast, directed by Christopher Morahan – (U.K.)
The Doll (Lalka), directed by Wojciech Jerzy Has – (Poland)
Don't Raise the Bridge, Lower the River, starring Jerry Lewis
Dracula Has Risen from the Grave, starring Christopher Lee – (U.K.)
Duniya (The World), starring Dev Anand and Vyjayanthimala – (India)

E
Eve, starring Robert Walker Jr., Christopher Lee, Herbert Lom
Even the Wind is Frightened (Hasta el viento tiene miedo) – (Mexico)

F
Faces, directed by John Cassavetes
Fando y Lis (Fando and Lis) – (Mexico)
Finian's Rainbow, directed by Francis Ford Coppola, starring Fred Astaire, Petula Clark, Tommy Steele, Don Francks, Keenan Wynn, Al Freeman Jr.
Fire, Water, and Brass Pipes, directed by Alexander Rou, starring Natalya Sedykh and Georgy Millyar – (U.S.S.R.)
Firecreek, starring James Stewart, Henry Fonda, Gary Lockwood, Jack Elam, James Best, Inger Stevens
The Fixer, directed by John Frankenheimer, starring Alan Bates and Dirk Bogarde – (U.K.)
For Love of Ivy, starring Sidney Poitier, Abbey Lincoln, Robert Duvall
For Singles Only, starring John Saxon, Mary Ann Mobley, Milton Berle
Funny Girl, directed by William Wyler, starring Barbra Streisand and Omar Sharif

G
The Girl on a Motorcycle, starring Alain Delon and Marianne Faithfull – (U.K./France)
The Girl with the Pistol (La ragazza con la pistola), starring Monica Vitti and Stanley Baker – (Italy)
Great Catherine, starring Peter O'Toole and Jeanne Moreau
The Great Silence (Il grande silenzio), starring Jean-Louis Trintignant and Klaus Kinski – (Italy)
The Green Berets, directed by and starring John Wayne, with Jim Hutton, David Janssen
Greetings, directed by Brian De Palma, starring Robert De Niro
Guns for San Sebastian, starring Anthony Quinn, Charles Bronson and Anjanette Comer

H
Hammerhead, starring Vince Edwards and Diana Dors
Hang 'Em High, directed by Ted Post, starring Clint Eastwood
Hatsukoi Jigokuhen (The Inferno of First Love) – (Japan)
Head, directed by Bob Rafelson, starring the Monkees
The Heart Is a Lonely Hunter, starring Alan Arkin and Sondra Locke
Hell in the Pacific, directed by John Boorman, starring Lee Marvin and Toshiro Mifune
Hellfighters, starring John Wayne, Katharine Ross, Jim Hutton
High School, directed by Frederick Wiseman
The Horse in the Gray Flannel Suit, starring Dean Jones
Hot Millions, starring Peter Ustinov and Maggie Smith
Hour of the Wolf (Vargtimmen), directed by Ingmar Bergman, starring Max von Sydow and Liv Ullmann – (Sweden)
House of Cards, starring George Peppard, Inger Stevens and Orson Welles
How to Save a Marriage and Ruin Your Life, starring Dean Martin and Stella Stevens
How Sweet It Is!, starring James Garner and Debbie Reynolds

I
I Am Curious (Blue) (Jag är nyfiken – en film i blått) – (Sweden)
I Love You, Alice B. Toklas, starring Peter Sellers
Ice Station Zebra, directed by John Sturges, starring Rock Hudson, Patrick McGoohan, Jim Brown, Ernest Borgnine
If...., directed by Lindsay Anderson, starring Malcolm McDowell – Palme d'Or winner – (U.K.)
The Immortal Story, directed by and starring Orson Welles – (France)
In Enemy Country, starring Anthony Franciosa
Inspector Clouseau, starring Alan Arkin – (U.K.)
Interlude, starring Oskar Werner, Barbara Ferris, Donald Sutherland
Isabel, starring Geneviève Bujold – (Canada)
Isadora, a.k.a. The Loves of Isadora, a biopic of Isadora Duncan, directed by Karel Reisz, starring Vanessa Redgrave, Jason Robards, James Fox – (U.K.)
It Rains in My Village (Biće skoro propast sveta), starring Annie Girardot – (Yugoslavia)

J
Je t'aime, je t'aime, directed by Alain Resnais – (France)
Jigsaw, starring Harry Guardino, Bradford Dillman and Hope Lange
Joanna, starring Geneviève Waïte

K
Kill! (Kiru) – (Japan)
Killers Three, starring Dick Clark and Merle Haggard
The Killing of Sister George, directed by Robert Aldrich, starring Beryl Reid, Susannah York and Coral Browne
King of Hearts – directed by Mohammad Ali Fardin (Iran)
Kona Coast, starring Vera Miles and Richard Boone
Kuroneko (a.k.a. Yabu no Naka no Kuroneko) – (Japan)

L
Lady in Cement, starring Frank Sinatra, Dan Blocker, Raquel Welch, Richard Conte, Martin Gabel, Lainie Kazan
The Last of the Mohicans (Ultimul Mohican) – (Romania)
The Legend of Lylah Clare, starring Kim Novak and Peter Finch
El Libro de piedra (The Book of Stone) – (Mexico)
The Lion in Winter, starring Peter O'Toole and Katharine Hepburn – (U.K.)
The Little Golden Calf (Zolotoy telyonok) – (U.S.S.R.)
Live a Little, Love a Little, starring Elvis Presley and Michele Carey
The Love Bug, directed by Robert Stevenson, starring Dean Jones, Michele Lee, Buddy Hackett
A Lovely Way to Die, starring Kirk Douglas and Sylva Koscina
Lucía – (Cuba)

M
Madigan, directed by Don Siegel, starring Richard Widmark, Inger Stevens, Henry Fonda, James Whitmore, Susan Clark
The Magus, starring Michael Caine, Anthony Quinn and Candice Bergen – (U.K.)
The Man Who Lies (L'homme qui ment / Muž, ktorý luže), starring Jean-Louis Trintignant – (France/Czechoslovakia)
The Man Who Lost His Shadow, directed by Kamal El Sheikh, starring Salah Zulfikar, Magda and Kamal El-Shennawi – (Egypt)
Mandabi (Le mendat), directed by Ousmane Sembène – (Senegal)
Matthew's Days (Żywot Mateusza) – (Poland)
Mayerling, starring Omar Sharif and Catherine Deneuve – (U.K./France)
Memories of Underdevelopment (Memorias del Subdesarrollo) – (Cuba)
Mera Naam Joker (My Name is Joker), directed by and starring Raj Kapoor – (India)
The Mercenary, also known as A Professional Gun, starring Franco Nero and Jack Palance – (Italy)
A Midsummer Night's Dream, directed by Peter Hall, starring Derek Godfrey, Ian Holm, Judi Dench and Helen Mirren – (U.K.)
A Minute to Pray, a Second to Die, starring Alex Cord, Arthur Kennedy, Robert Ryan – (Italy)
The Money Jungle, starring Lola Albright and Leslie Parrish
Monterey Pop, a concert film by D. A. Pennebaker, featuring Simon & Garfunkel, The Mamas & the Papas, Jimi Hendrix and others
Murder a la Mod, directed by Brian De Palma
My Wife's Goblin, directed by Fatin Abdel Wahab, starring Salah Zulfikar and Shadia – (Egypt)

N
Naked Children (L'enfance nue), directed by Maurice Pialat – (France)
Neel Kamal – (India)
Negatives, starring Peter McEnery, Glenda Jackson and Diane Cilento– (U.K.)
Never a Dull Moment, starring Dick Van Dyke, Dorothy Provine, Edward G. Robinson
The Night of the Following Day, starring Marlon Brando, Richard Boone, Rita Moreno
Night of the Living Dead, first in the zombie trilogy by George A. Romero
The Night They Raided Minsky's, directed by William Friedkin, starring Jason Robards
The Nile and the Life, directed by Youssef Chahine, starring Salah Zulfikar – (Egypt)
Nobody Runs Forever (a.k.a. The High Commissioner), directed by Ralph Thomas, starring Rod Taylor, Scobie Malone and Christopher Plummer – (U.K./U.S.)
Nobody's Perfect, starring Doug McClure
No Way to Treat a Lady, starring Rod Steiger, George Segal, Lee Remick
Las Noches del Hombre Lobo (Nights of the Werewolf) – (Spain/France)

O
The Odd Couple, directed by Gene Saks, starring Jack Lemmon and Walter Matthau
Oliver!, directed by Carol Reed, starring Ron Moody, Oliver Reed, Shani Wallis, Jack Wild, Mark Lester – winner of six Academy Awards – (U.K.)
Once Upon a Time in the West (C'era una volta il West), directed by Sergio Leone, starring Charles Bronson, Henry Fonda, Claudia Cardinale, Jason Robards – (Italy)
The One and Only, Genuine, Original Family Band, starring Walter Brennan, Buddy Ebsen, Kurt Russell, Wally Cox, Lesley Ann Warren
One Plus One (a.k.a. Sympathy for the Devil), a docudrama directed by Jean-Luc Godard, featuring the Rolling Stones – (U.K.)
Otley, starring Tom Courtenay and Romy Schneider – (U.K.)

P
Padosan (Neighbour), starring Sunil Dutt – (India)
Palo y hueso (Stick and Bone) – (Argentina)
The Party, directed by Blake Edwards, starring Peter Sellers and Claudine Longet
Performance, directed by Nicolas Roeg and Donald Cammell, starring Mick Jagger and James Fox – (U.K.)
Petulia, starring Julie Christie and George C. Scott
The Pink Jungle, starring James Garner
P.J., starring George Peppard, Gayle Hunnicutt, Raymond Burr, Susan Saint James
A Place for Lovers (Amanti), directed by Vittorio De Sica, starring Marcello Mastroianni and Faye Dunaway
Planet of the Apes, directed by Franklin J. Schaffner, starring Charlton Heston, Roddy McDowall, Kim Hunter
The Power, starring George Hamilton
Pretty Poison, starring Tuesday Weld and Anthony Perkins
The Private Navy of Sgt. O'Farrell, starring Bob Hope and Phyllis Diller
The Producers, written and directed by Mel Brooks, starring Zero Mostel, Gene Wilder, Kenneth Mars, Dick Shawn
The Prophet (Il profeta), directed by Dino Risi, starring Vittorio Gassman and Ann-Margret – (Italy)
The Profound Desire of the Gods (Kamigami no Fukaki Yokubō), directed by Shohei Imamura – (Japan)
Project X, directed by William Castle
Prudence and the Pill, starring Deborah Kerr and David Niven – (U.K.)
Psych-Out, directed by Richard Rush, starring Susan Strasberg, Dean Stockwell, Jack Nicholson

R
Rachel, Rachel, directed by Paul Newman and starring Joanne Woodward
Romeo and Juliet, directed by Franco Zeffirelli, starring Leonard Whiting and Olivia Hussey – (U.K./Italy)
Rosemary's Baby, directed by Roman Polanski, starring Mia Farrow and John Cassavetes

S
Saathi, starring Vyjayanthimala, Rajendra Kumar and Simi Garewal – (India)
Salt and Pepper, directed by Richard Donner, starring Sammy Davis Jr. and Peter Lawford – (U.K.)
The Scalphunters, starring Burt Lancaster, Ossie Davis and Telly Savalas
The Sea Gull, directed by Sidney Lumet, starring Vanessa Redgrave and Simone Signoret – (U.S./ U.K./Greece)
Sebastian, starring Dirk Bogarde and Susannah York – (U.K.)
Secret Ceremony, starring Elizabeth Taylor, Mia Farrow and Robert Mitchum
The Secret Life of an American Wife, starring Walter Matthau
The Secret War of Harry Frigg, starring Paul Newman
The Sergeant, starring Rod Steiger and John Phillip Law
Sergeant Ryker, starring Lee Marvin and Vera Miles
The Shakiest Gun in the West, starring Don Knotts and Barbara Rhoades
Shalako, starring Sean Connery and Brigitte Bardot – (U.K.)
Shame (Skammen), directed by Ingmar Bergman, starring Liv Ullmann and Max von Sydow – (Sweden)*
 Sherlock Holmes (British) a series of 15 Sherlock Holmes films made for BBC-TV, starring Peter Cushing as Sherlock Holmes and Nigel Stock as Dr. Watson
The Shoes of the Fisherman, starring Anthony Quinn, Laurence Olivier, John Gielgud, Oskar Werner, Leo McKern, David Janssen, Barbara Jefford
Signs of Life (Lebenszeichen), directed by Werner Herzog – (West Germany)
Single Room Furnished, starring Jayne Mansfield in her final film
Skidoo, directed by Otto Preminger, starring Jackie Gleason, Carol Channing and, in his final film, Groucho Marx
Sol Madrid, starring David McCallum, Stella Stevens, Rip Torn
Song of Summer, directed by Ken Russell – (made for television) – (U.K.)
Speedway, starring Elvis Presley and Nancy Sinatra
Spider Baby, starring Lon Chaney Jr.
Spirits of the Dead, directed by Federico Fellini, Louis Malle and Roger Vadim, starring Jane Fonda, Brigitte Bardot, Alain Delon, Terence Stamp, Peter Fonda – (France/Italy)
The Split, starring Jim Brown, Gene Hackman, Ernest Borgnine, Julie Harris
The Stalking Moon, starring Gregory Peck and Eva Marie Saint
Star!, starring Julie Andrews
Stay Away, Joe, starring Elvis Presley
Stolen Kisses (Baisers volés), directed by François Truffaut, starring Jean-Pierre Léaud and Delphine Seyrig – (France)
The Strange Affair, starring Susan George – (U.K.)
The Subject was Roses, starring Patricia Neal, Jack Albertson, Martin Sheen
Sunghursh, starring Dilip Kumar and Vyjayanthimala – (India)
The Swedish Kings (Shvedskite krale), directed by Lyudmil Kirkov, starring Kiril Gospodinov – (Bulgaria)
The Sweet Ride, starring Michael Sarrazin and Jacqueline Bisset
 The Swimmer, starring Burt Lancaster

T
Targets, directed by Peter Bogdanovich, starring Boris Karloff
Teorema, directed by Pier Paolo Pasolini, starring Silvana Mangano and Terence Stamp – (Italy)
Tevye and His Seven Daughters (Tuvia Vesheva Benotav), directed by Menahem Golan – (Israel)
They Came to Rob Las Vegas, starring Gary Lockwood, Elke Sommer, Lee J. Cobb, Jack Palance
The Thomas Crown Affair, directed by Norman Jewison, starring Steve McQueen and Faye Dunaway
Three in the Attic, starring Christopher Jones, Yvette Mimieux, Judy Pace, Maggie Thrett
A Twist of Sand, starring Richard Johnson and Honor Blackman – (U.K.)
Twisted Nerve, starring Hywel Bennett and Hayley Mills – (U.K.)

U
The Unfaithful Wife (La Femme infidèle), directed by Claude Chabrol, starring Stéphane Audran – (France)
Up the Junction, starring Dennis Waterman and Suzy Kendall – (U.K.)

V
Villa Rides, starring Yul Brynner and Robert Mitchum
Vixen!, directed by Russ Meyer

W
What's So Bad About Feeling Good?, starring George Peppard and Mary Tyler Moore
Where Angels Go, Trouble Follows, starring Rosalind Russell
Where Eagles Dare, directed by Brian G. Hutton, starring Richard Burton and Clint Eastwood – (U.K./U.S.)
Who Saw Him Die? (Ole dole doff), directed by Jan Troell – (Sweden)
The Wicked Dreams of Paula Schultz, starring Elke Sommer and Bob Crane
Wild 90, directed by and starring Norman Mailer
Wild in the Streets, starring Christopher Jones, Shelley Winters, Hal Holbrook
Will Penny, starring Charlton Heston and Joan Hackett
Winnie the Pooh and the Blustery Day (animation short)
Witchfinder General, directed by Michael Reeves, starring Vincent Price – (U.K.)
With Six You Get Eggroll, directed by Howard Morris, starring Doris Day, Brian Keith, Barbara Hershey
Woman in Chains (La prisonnière), directed by Henri-Georges Clouzot – (France)

Y
Yellow Submarine, an animated film with music by The Beatles – (U.K.)
Yours, Mine and Ours, starring Lucille Ball and Henry Fonda

Short film series
Looney Tunes (1930–1969)
Merrie Melodies (1931–1969)
Speedy Gonzales (1953–1968)
Daffy Duck (1937–1968)
 Cool Cat (1967–1969)
 Merlin the Magic Mouse (1967–1969)

Births
January 1 - Tom DeSanto, American producer and screenwriter
January 2
Cuba Gooding Jr., American actor
Evan Parke, Jamaican-born American actor
January 6 – John Singleton, American director and writer (d. 2019)
January 12
Farrah Forke, American actress (d. 2022)
Rachael Harris, American actor and comedian
January 14 – LL Cool J, American rapper, actor
January 15 - Rosanne Sorrentino, American former child actress
January 18 - David Ayer, American filmmaker
January 19 – Matt Hill, Canadian actor, voice actor, comedian
January 20 - Chris Miller (animator), American voice actor, animator, director, screenwriter and storyboard artist
January 29 – Edward Burns, American actor and producer
February 1 – Pauly Shore, American actor
February 12
Josh Brolin, American actor
Chynna Phillips, American singer and actress
February 13 - Kelly Hu, American actress, voice artist, former fashion model and beauty queen
February 14
Alicia Borrachero, Spanish actress
Phil Lewis, American actor, comedian and director
February 18 – Molly Ringwald, American actress
March 2 – Daniel Craig, British actor
March 4 – Patsy Kensit, English actress
March 6 - Moira Kelly, American actress
March 12
Aaron Eckhart, American actor
Jason Lively, American actor
March 20
Jaime Cardriche, American actor (d. 2000)
Lawrence Makoare, New Zealand actor of Māori descent
March 26 - Max Perlich, American actor
March 29 - Lucy Lawless, New Zealand actress and singer
March 30
Celine Dion, Canadian singer
Roland Kickinger, Austrian actor and bodybuilder
April 3 - Charlotte Coleman, English actress (d. 2001)
April 8
Patricia Arquette, American actress
Shawn Fonteno, American actor and rapper
April 13 - Andrew Pleavin, English actor
April 14 – Anthony Michael Hall, American actor
April 18
Mary Birdsong, American actress, comedian, writer and singer
David Hewlett, British-born Canadian actor, writer and director
April 19 – Ashley Judd, American actress
April 24
Aidan Gillen, Irish actor
Stacy Haiduk, American actress
May 3 – Amy Ryan, American actress
May 10 - Adrian Scarborough, English actor
May 11 - Jeffrey Donovan, American actor
May 12
Tony Hawk, American actor and professional skateboarder
May 16 - Stephen Mangan, English actor, comedian and presenter
May 20 – Timothy Olyphant, American actor
May 23 - John Ortiz, American actor
May 28 - Kylie Minogue, Australian actress and singer
June 2
Navid Negahban, Iranian-American actor
Nickolai Stoilov, Bulgarian-American actor and writer
June 4 - Joey Mazzarino, American actor, puppeteer, writer and director
June 9 - Eddie Marsan, English actor
June 10 - Bill Burr, American stand-up comedian, actor and writer
June 14 - Faizon Love, Cuban-born American actor and comedian
June 16 - James Patrick Stuart, American actor
June 19 - Kim Walker (actress), American actress (d. 2001)
June 20 - Robert Rodriguez, American filmmaker and visual effects supervisor
June 29 - Brian d'Arcy James, American actor and musician
July 1 - Jordi Mollà, Spanish actor, writer and filmmaker
July 5 - Michael Stuhlbarg, American actor
July 7
Danny Jacobs (actor), American actor and comedian
Allen Payne, American actor
July 8 – Billy Crudup, American actor
July 11 - Conrad Vernon, American voice actor, director, writer and storyboard artist
July 15
Eddie Griffin, American comedian and actor
Stan Kirsch, American actor (d. 2020) 
July 18
Grant Bowler, New-Zealand-Australian actor
Alex Désert, American actor and musician
July 23 - Shawn Levy, Canadian director, producer and actor
July 24 – Kristin Chenoweth, American actress and singer
July 26 – Olivia Williams, British actress
July 27
Cliff Curtis, New Zealand actor
Julian McMahon, Australian-American actor
July 30 - Terry Crews, American actor, comedian, activist, artist, bodybuilder and former professional football player
August 4 - Daniel Dae Kim, South Korean-American actor and producer
August 7 - Sophie Lee, Australian actress
August 9 
Gillian Anderson, American-British actress
Eric Bana, Australian actor
McG, American director and producer
August 10 - Cate Shortland, Australian screenwriter, director and writer
August 11 – Sophie Okonedo, British actress
August 14
Catherine Bell (actress), British actress and model
Terry Notary, American actor and stunt co-ordinator/double
August 15 - Debra Messing, American actress
August 21 - Julian Lewis Jones, Welsh actor
August 27 - Lisa Marie Newmyer, American actress
August 28 – Billy Boyd, Scottish actor
September 2 - Kristen Cloke, American actress
September 4 – John DiMaggio, American actor and voice actor
September 5 - Glenn Fleshler, American actor
September 7 - Camille Japy, Belgian-French actor
September 8
Brian Huskey, American character actor, comedian and writer
Simon J. Smith, British animator, director, visual effects artist and voice actor
September 9 – Julia Sawalha, English actress
September 10 – Guy Ritchie, English director, screenwriter
September 12 - Paul F. Tompkins, American comedian, actor and writer
September 15 – Danny Nucci, American actor
September 15 – Shawn Doyle, Canadian actor
September 20 - Chad Stahelski, American stuntman and director
September 22 –  Megan Hollingshead, American voice actress
September 25 – Will Smith, American actor
September 26 – Jim Caviezel, American actor
September 28 – Naomi Watts, British actress
September 29 - Massi Furlan, Italian-American actor and producer
October – Musola Cathrine Kaseketi, Zambian director
October 2
Lucy Cohu, English actress
Joey Slotnick, American actor
October 9
Pete Docter, American animator, director, screenwriter, producer, voice actor and chief creative officer of Pixar
James Dreyfus, English actor
October 11
Tiffany Grant, American voice actress
Jane Krakowski, American actress and singer
October 12
Hugh Jackman, Australian actor
Adam Rich, American actor (d. 2023)
October 13
Tisha Campbell, American actress
Alex Ferns, Scottish actor and television personality
October 17 - Ziggy Marley, Jamaican singer-songwriter, musician and actor
October 19 - Yayan Ruhian, Indonesian martial artist and actor
October 23 - Maria Darling, British voice actress
October 24 - Mark Walton (story artist), American story artist and voice actor
October 25 - Melinda McGraw, American actress
October 27 – Dileep, Indian actor
October 29 - Grayson McCouch, American actor
November 5 – Sam Rockwell, American actor
November 6 – Kelly Rutherford, American actress
November 8
Bruno Gunn, American actor
Parker Posey, American actress
November 10 – Tracy Morgan, American actor, voice actor and comedian
November 16 - James Parks (actor), American actor
November 18 – Owen Wilson, American actor
November 21
Todd Farmer, American screenwriter and actor
Sean Schemmel, American voice actor
November 23 - Brennan Brown, American actor
December 2 – Lucy Liu, American actress
December 3 – Brendan Fraser, American-Canadian actor
December 5 - Margaret Cho, American stand-up comedian, actress and musician
December 6 - Oliver Masucci, German actor
December 7 – Greg Ayres, American voice actor
December 13 - Scott Stuber, American film producer
December 18
Craig Grant, American poet and actor (d. 2021)
Daniel Oreskes, American actor
Nina Wadia, British actress and comedian
December 19 - Chris Williams (director), Canadian-American animator, director, screenwriter and voice actor
December 20 - Joe Cornish, English comedian and filmmaker
December 26 - Byron Howard, American animator, director, producer and screenwriter

Deaths
January 7 - Hugo Butler, 53, Canadian screenwriter, Edison, the Man, Lassie Come Home
January 18 – John Ridgely, 58, American actor, The Big Sleep, God Is My Co-Pilot
January 25 - Virginia Maskell, 31, British actress, Only Two Can Play, Virgin Island
February 4 – Eddie Baker, 70, American actor, Oranges and Lemons, Giant
February 7 – Nick Adams, 36, American actor, Pillow Talk, Rebel Without a Cause
February 13 – Mae Marsh, 73, American actress, The Birth of a Nation, 3 Godfathers
February 20 – Anthony Asquith, 65, British director, The V.I.P.s, The Winslow Boy
March 10 – Helen Walker, 47, American actress, Impact, Call Northside 777
March 11 – Pearl Doles Bell, 84, American film scenarist, novelist and editor, Her Elephant Man
March 16 – June Collyer, 63, American actress, Hangman's House, A Face in the Fog
March 18 - Harry Kurnitz, 60, American screenwriter, Witness for the Prosecution, How to Steal a Million
March 20 – Carl Theodor Dreyer, 79, Danish director, The Passion of Joan of Arc, Gertrud
March 24 – Alice Guy-Blaché, 94, pioneer French/American filmmaker, The Pit and the Pendulum, The Great Adventure
March 30 – Bobby Driscoll, 31, American actor, Peter Pan, Treasure Island
April 5 – Lois Andrews, 44, American actress, Dixie Dugan, The Desert Hawk
April 6 – Keith Pyott, 66, English actor, Village of the Damned
April 16 – Fay Bainter, 74, American actress, Woman of the Year, The Children's Hour
April 24 – Tommy Noonan, 46, American actor, A Star is Born, Gentlemen Prefer Blondes
May 5 – Albert Dekker, 62, American actor, The Wild Bunch, Kiss Me Deadly
May 9 
Albert Lewin, 73, American director, Pandora and the Flying Dutchman, The Picture of Dorian Gray
Marion Lorne, 84, American actress, The Graduate, Strangers on a Train
May 10 – Scotty Beckett, 38, American actor, My Favorite Wife, The Jolson Story
May 21 – Doris Lloyd, 71, British actress, Disraeli, Kind Lady
May 23 – James Burke, 81, American actor, Little Orphan Annie, The Timber Trail
May 25 – Charles K. Feldman, 64, American producer, A Streetcar Named Desire, The Seven Year Itch
May 26 - Joseph MacDonald, 62, Mexico-born American cinematographer, My Darling Clementine, The Young Lions
May 27 – Denise Legeay, 70, French actress, Happy Couple, Zigano
May 31 – Preben Uglebjerg, 37, Danish actor, Pigen og vandpytten
June 4 – Dorothy Gish, 70, American actress, The Cardinal, Orphans of the Storm
June 7 – Dan Duryea, 61, American actor, Winchester '73, Scarlet Street
June 8 - Patricia Jessel, 47, British actress, The City of the Dead, A Funny Thing Happened on the Way to the Forum
June 21 – Ingeborg Spangsfeldt, 72, Danish actress
June 24 – Tony Hancock, 44, British comedian, Call Me Genius, The Punch and Judy Man
June 29 – Hans Egede Budtz, 78, Danish actor, Nøddebo Præstegård
July 1 – Virginia Weidler, 41, American actress, The Philadelphia Story, The Women
July 12 – Antonio Pietrangeli, 49, Italian director, It Happened in Rome, The Magnificent Cuckold
July 27 – Lilian Harvey, 62, British actress and singer, Waltz of Love, Let's Live Tonight
July 30 – Alexander Hall, 74, American director, Here Comes Mr. Jordan, Little Miss Marker
August 23 – Hunt Stromberg, 74, American producer, The Thin Man, The Great Ziegfeld
August 26 – Kay Francis, 63, American actress, Charley's Aunt, Little Men
August 30 – William Talman, 53, American actor, The Hitch-Hiker, Crashout
August 31 – Dennis O'Keefe, 60, American actor, T-Men, Raw Deal
September 3 – Isabel Withers, 72, American actress, Possessed, Lady of Burlesque
September 16 - Nedrick Young, 54, American screenwriter, Inherit the Wind, The Defiant Ones
September 18 – Franchot Tone, 63, American actor, The Mutiny on the Bounty, Advise & Consent
September 24 - Virginia Valli, 70, American actress, The Pleasure Garden, Evening Clothes
October 18 – Lee Tracy, 70, American actor, Dinner at Eight, The Best Man
October 29 – Pert Kelton, 61, American actress, The Music Man, Sing and Like It
October 30 – Ramon Novarro, 69, Mexican actor, Ben-Hur, Mata Hari
November 8 – Wendell Corey, 54, American actor, Rear Window, Harriet Craig
November 9 – Gerald Mohr, 54, American actor, Gilda, The Angry Red Planet
November 18 – Walter Wanger, 74, American producer, Cleopatra, I Want to Live!
November 25 – Upton Sinclair, 90, American author and producer, There Will Be Blood, The Gnome-Mobile
December 2 – Colin Kenny, 79, Irish actor, The Adventures of Robin Hood, Captain Blood
December 4 - Archie Mayo, 77, American director, The Petrified Forest, A Night in Casablanca
December 5 – Fred Clark, 54, American actor, White Heat, Auntie Mame
December 12 – Tallulah Bankhead, 66, American actress, Lifeboat, Stage Door Canteen, Die! Die! My Darling
December 14 – Jack Rice, 75, American actor, Lady, Let's Dance, Beware of Blondie
December 15 – Dorothy Abbott, 47, American actress, South Pacific, Red, Hot and Blue
December 20 - John Steinbeck, 66, American author and screenwriter, Viva Zapata!, The Red Pony
December 28 - Harry Woods, 79, American actress, Days of Jesse James, The Ghost Rider

Film debuts
Rutanya Alda – Greetings
Sônia Braga – The Red Light Bandit
Gary Busey – Wild in the Streets
John Cleese – Interlude
Timothy Dalton – The Lion in Winter
Frederic Forrest – The Filthy Five
Gerrit Graham – Greetings
Goldie Hawn – The One and Only, Genuine, Original Family Band
Barbara Hershey – With Six You Get Eggroll
Howard Hesseman – Petulia
Ian Holm – The Bofors Gun
Madeline Kahn – The Dove
Lainie Kazan – Dayton's Devils
Stacy Keach – The Heart Is a Lonely Hunter
Margot Kidder – The Best Damn Fiddler from Calabogie to Kaladar
Udo Kier – Shameless
Sally Kirkland – Blue
Malcolm McDowell – if...
Chuck Norris – The Wrecking Crew
Austin Pendleton – Petulia
Joely Richardson – The Charge of the Light Brigade
Hanna Schygulla – The Bridegroom, the Comedienne and the Pimp
Talia Shire – The Wild Racers

References

External links
 "Filmmaking in West Germany, 1968" (Goethe-Institut)

 
Film by year